Fritsch is a German surname. Like Fritsche, Fritzsch and Fritzsche, it is a patronymic derived from Friedrich.

Notable people with the surname include:
Ahasverus Fritsch (1629–1701), German jurist, poet and hymn writer
Antonin Fritsch, Czech palaeontologist
Bayley Fritsch (born 1996), professional Australian rules footballer 
Bernard Joseph Fritsch (1881–1951), Australian rules footballer 
Brad Fritsch (born 1977), Canadian professional golfer
Eberhard Ludwig Cäsar Fritsch (died 1974), the editor and publisher of the pro-Nazi monthly magazine in Argentina Der Weg
Edward F. Fritsch (born 1950), scientist
Elizabeth Fritsch (born 1940), British potter
Eloy Fernando Fritsch (born 1968), Brazilian electronic musician
Felix Eugen Fritsch, English phycologist
Ferdinand Fritsch (1898-1966/7), Austrian football manager
Florian Fritsch (born 1985), German professional golfer 
Frederick William Fritsch (born 1954), American former bobsleigh athlete
Gerhard Fritsch (1924–1969), Austrian novelist and poet
Gunther von Fritsch (1906–1988), film director
Gustav Fritsch (1837–1927), German physiologist
Hans Fritsch (1911–1987), German discus thrower
Heinrich Fritsch (1844–1915), German gynecologist and obstetrician 
Horst Fritsch (1931–2010), a German Green Party politician
Jamie Fritsch (born 1985), American former professional ice hockey defensemen
Johannes Fritsch (1941–2010), a German composer
Karl Fritsch (1864–1934), Austrian botanist
Karl von Fritsch (1838–1906), German geologist
Karl Fritsch (jeweller) (born 1963), German-born contemporary jeweller
Katharina Fritsch (born 1956), German sculptor 
Lisa Fritsch (born 1975), American author and community activist
Ludwig Fritsch, pseudonym of Marie Luise Droop (1890–1959), German writer, director and producer
Margaret Goodin Fritsch (1899–1993), American architect
Michael Fritsch, academic and researcher in the field of Economics
Nicolas Fritsch (born 1978), French cyclist
Paul Fritsch (1859–1913), German co-inventor of the Fritsch–Buttenberg–Wiechell rearrangement
Paul Fritsch (1901–1970), French boxer
Rüdiger von Fritsch (born 1953), German diplomat and author
Stephan Fritsch (1962-2014), German artist
Theodore Edward Fritsch Jr. (born 1950), former American football center 
Theodor Fritsch (1852–1933), German publisher and anti-semitic pundit
Thomas Fritsch (1944–2021), German television and dubbing actor
Toni Fritsch (1945–2005), Austrian player of football (soccer) and American football
Waldemar Fritsch (1909–1978), German porcelain sculptor and ceramist
Walter Fritsch (1911-date of death unknown), Chilean hurdler
Werner von Fritsch (1880–1939), German Wehrmacht officer
Willy Fritsch (1901-1973), German theater and film actor
Wolfgang Fritsch (born 1949), German lightweight rower

See also
 Fritsche
 Fritzsch
 Fritzsche (disambiguation)
 Frič, Czechized variation of the name
 Blomberg-Fritsch Affair
 Fritsch–Buttenberg–Wiechell rearrangement

German-language surnames
Surnames from given names